Oskar Filip Emil Åberg (2 January 1864 — 27 March 1940) was a Swedish painter, graphic artics, illustrator, animator, and director.

Biography
Emil Åberg was the son of Captain Carl Emil Ferdinand Åberg and Hedda Wilhelmina Moll. He studied painting with Edvard Perséus and at the Technical School in Stockholm. Then he studied at the Academy of Fine Arts 1883–1888 doing etching for Axel Tallberg. Together with Aron Gerle, he exhibited at Hultbergs konsthandel in Stockholm in 1911 and he participated in group exhibitions with the Swedish Artists' Association and the Graphic Society. He participated in the Baltic exhibition 1914 and in an international graphics exhibition in Leipzig 1914.

In his art, Emil Åberg often painted genre pictures in 18th century environments, landscape views, city views and portraits, often using warm colors.

As an illustrator, he made pictures for newspapers, postcards and several issues of the Children's Library Saga and Christmas magazines.  Emil Åberg worked in 1916 for the production company Pathé Frère's branch in Stockholm and made three animated short films there.

Emil Åberg is buried in the Northern Cemetery (Norra begravningsplatsen) outside Stockholm.

Works

Books illustrated
 I vilda vestern : äfventyr, upplefvade i indianernas land(1895) by Ludvig Anders
 Ljus och skuggor : originalberättelse (1899) by Leonard Strömberg
 De tre musketörerna (The Three Musketeers)(1902) by Alexandre Dumas
 Kalle Hjelms barndomsminnen : berättande af honom sjelf : och upptecknade (1889) 
 Grefven af Montecristo (The Count of Monte Cristo) (1902) by Alexandre Dumas
 Myladys son eller tjugu år efteråt. (1902) by Alexandre Dumas

Animated short films
 1916 - Little Kalle's dream of her snowman (Lilla Kalles dröm om sin snögubbe)
 1916 - Mr. Klot, Mr. Spider-Bone and Little Miss Synål (Herr Klot, herr Spindelben och lilla fröken Synål)
 1916 - The Adventures of Master Tricks  (Mäster Tricks äventyr)

Gallery

References

External links

 Emil Åberg holdings in Alvin portal

1864 births
1940 deaths
Swedish illustrators
Swedish cartoonists
19th-century Swedish artists

People from Uppsala
20th-century Swedish artists